Compromising Positions is a 1985 American film released by Paramount Pictures and directed by Frank Perry. The screenplay, by Susan Isaacs, was adapted from her 1978 novel. The plot concerns a Long Island housewife and former journalist who becomes involved in a murder investigation.

The film stars Susan Sarandon, Raúl Juliá, Judith Ivey, Edward Herrmann, Mary Beth Hurt, Joe Mantegna, Deborah Rush, Anne De Salvo, and Josh Mostel.  Joan Allen has a small role.

Plot
Judith Singer is a former Newsday reporter who misses her old life, now that her husband Bob spends most of his time at work and her time at home on Long Island has become a bore.

When her dentist, Dr. Bruce Fleckstein, is found murdered, Judith sees the possibility of a story that she might be able to sell to the newspaper's editor, maybe even get her old job back. Judith might have been the last person to see Fleckstein alive, which makes detective David Suarez consider her both a possible witness and a suspect.

Fleckstein was a lecher and a louse. Decked out in gold jewelry, he cheated on his wife Phyllis and preyed on his female patients. Not only did Fleckstein have affairs in a motel with several of his patients, but he also took compromising Polaroids of many women while they were asleep in his dentist chair.

The murderer could have been sculptor Nancy Miller, or perhaps Judith's next-door neighbor Peg Tuccio, or any number of possibilities. Suarez is determined to solve the case before amateur detective Judith beats him to it.

Cast
 Susan Sarandon as Judith Singer
 Raul Julia as David Suarez
 Joe Mantegna as Dr. Fleckstein
 Mary Beth Hurt as Peg Tuccio
 Edward Herrmann as Bob Singer
 Judith Ivey as Nancy Miller
 Deborah Rush as Brenda Dunck
 Josh Mostel as Dicky Dunck
 Anne De Salvo as Phyllis Fleckstein

Reaction
The film is reviewed, favorably, in Pauline Kael's ninth collection of movie reviews Hooked. She is especially complimentary about Susan Sarandon's performance. "The screenplay provides a batch of actresses with a chance to show some comic verve. Susan Sarandon's smile has never been more incredibly lush, and she does some inspired double takes - just letting her beautiful dark eyes pop."  "It's fun to have a movie about a woman whose curiosity is her salvation."

References

External links
 
 
 
 
 

1985 comedy films
1985 films
American comedy thriller films
American comedy mystery films
1980s comedy mystery films
Films based on American novels
Films directed by Frank Perry
Films scored by Brad Fiedel
Films set in Long Island
Films shot in New York (state)
Paramount Pictures films
1980s English-language films
1980s American films